Shekher is a village in the Khojavend District of Azerbaijan, in the disputed region of Nagorno-Karabakh. The village had an ethnic Armenian-majority population prior to the 2020 Nagorno-Karabakh war, and also had an Armenian majority in 1989.

History 
During the Soviet period, the village was part of the Martuni District of the Nagorno-Karabakh Autonomous Oblast within the Azerbaijan Soviet Socialist Republic. After the First Nagorno-Karabakh War, the village was administrated as part of the Martuni Province of the breakaway Republic of Artsakh. The village came under the control of Azerbaijan on 9 November 2020, during the 2020 Nagorno-Karabakh war.

Historical heritage sites 
Historical heritage sites in and around the village include the church of Surb Vardan, the 16th/17th-century shrine of Pir Bab with an adjacent khachkar, and two 17th-century khachkars.

Demographics 
The village had 408 inhabitants in 2005, and 407 inhabitants in 2015.

Partnerships 
In October 2018, the village signed a friendship declaration with the Commune of Arnouville, France. In June 2019, the French administrative court of Cergy-Pontoise declared that the signing breached French law by exceeding the authority of a municipal jurisdiction and by not respecting the international commitments of France (notably Nagorno-Karabakh's lack of recognition as a state), proclaiming the declaration null and void.

References

External links 
 

Populated places in Khojavend District
Populated places in Martuni Province
Nagorno-Karabakh
Former Armenian inhabited settlements